Samuel Arnold may refer to:

Samuel Arnold (composer) (1740–1802), English composer and organist
Samuel Arnold (Connecticut politician) (1806–1869), U.S. Representative from Connecticut
Samuel Arnold (conspirator) (1834–1906), co-conspirator of a plot to kidnap U.S. President Abraham Lincoln
Samuel G. Arnold (1821–1880), U.S. Senator from Rhode Island
Samuel James Arnold (1774–1852), English dramatist
Samuel W. Arnold (1879–1961), U.S. Representative from Missouri
Samuel Arnold (actor) (born 1992), a French actor.